Yin Tao (born 6 December 1979) is a Chinese actress. In 2017, she became one of the Chinese actresses to win the "Grand Slam", after winning the three biggest awards including the Feitian Awards, Golden Eagle Awards and the Magnolia Awards.

Biography

Early life
Born and raised in Chongqing, where she attended Chongqing Art School in 1996. Yin entered People's Liberation Army Arts College in 1999, majoring in drama, where she graduated in 2003. After graduation, Yin worked in Chinese People's Liberation Army Naval Song and Dance Troupe.

Acting career
In 2002, Yin participated in her first stage play while still in college Wait for You in Paradise. Her performance was widely recognized, winning an array of trophies including the Golden Lion Award for Performance, the award for Excellent Performance at the 8th Cao Yu Drama Award, and the Best Leading Actress of the 5th Shanghai Magnolia Award.

Yin's subsequent performances in TV series The Sky of History, and Catching the Wrong Bus brought her into the limelight. She also won the Outstanding Actress Award at the 23rd Golden Eagle Awards for her performance as A-mei in Catching the Wrong Bus.

In 2007, Yin starred in the military romance drama Happiness As Flowers. She received a Flying Apsaras Award nomination for Best Actress.

In 2008, Yin starred in The Woman's Lifetime, and was nominated for the Best Actress Award at the 14th Shanghai Television Festival. She also as the torch bearer in the 2008 Beijing Olympic Games.

In 2009, she starred in two hit television series  In a Land Far Faraway and The Prominent Clan. Both shows earned high ratings and won accolades from critics and TV viewers. The same year, Yin co-starred with Anthony Wong in the historical television series The Legend of Yang Guifei. Playing Yang Guifei, one of the Four Beauties of ancient China. Yin’s natural beauty and consummate acting skill demonstrated in this show pushed her acting career to a new level.

In 2010, she starred in historical drama The Firmament of The Pleiades, which became the first television series from China to be screened on Japan's NHK at prime time. Yin impressed viewers with her refined performance that the Japanese viewers have dubbed her "Chinese Aurora".

In 2011, Yin starred in the historical television series Secret History of Empress Wu, playing the titular role Wu Zetian. The drama received positive reviews.

In 2013, Yin won the Outstanding Actress Award at the 29th Flying Apsaras Awards for her roles in Family on the Go and The Love in Yan'an. That same year, Yin featured in action film Police Story 2013, starring alongside Jackie Chan.

In 2017, Yin won Magnolia Award for Best Actress in a Television Series for her performance in Feather Flies to the Sky. The same year, she was cast alongside Huang Xiaoming in the television series The Years You Were Late.

In 2020, Yin served as one of jury members for the Chinese TV Series of the TV Series category of the Magnolia Awards.

Filmography

Film

Television series

Theater

Awards and nominations

References

External links

1979 births
People's Liberation Army Arts College alumni
Actresses from Chongqing
Living people
Chinese film actresses
Chinese television actresses
20th-century Chinese actresses
21st-century Chinese actresses